Karen R. Harris is an American educational psychologist and special educator who has researched the development of learning strategies and self-regulation among students with learning challenges such as learning disabilities and attention deficit hyperactivity disorder. She is currently the Mary Emily Warner Professor (a chair she shares with Steve Graham) in the Division of Educational Leadership and Innovation, Mary Lou Fulton Teachers College at Arizona State University.

Career
Harris has worked in the field of education for over 35 years, initially as a general education teacher and then as a special education teacher. Her research focuses on informing and improving theory, research, and practice related to writing development among students with high incidence disabilities, students who struggle academically, and normally achieving students. She is interested in validating instructional approaches for heterogeneous classrooms and students with special needs derived from integrating multiple, evidence-based theories. She developed the Self-Regulated Strategy Development (SRSD) model of strategies instruction; SRSD has been most extensively researched in the area of writing, although researchers have also addressed applications in reading, math, and homework. Her current research focuses on practice-based professional development in SRSD for general and special educators (focusing on outcomes among both teachers and students), and on using technology to improve literacy instruction.

Former editor of the Journal of Educational Psychology, Harris is senior editor of the American Psychological Association Educational Psychology Handbook (2012). She is senior editor (along with Steve Graham) of the What Works for Special Needs Learners series published by Guilford Press. She is co-author or co-editor of several books and numerous articles, and has served on editorial boards for journals in special education, educational psychology, and general education. She is a Fellow of both the American Psychological Association and the American Educational Research Association. She has served as President of the Division for Research of the Council for Exceptional Children and as an officer or committee member for the American Educational Research Association and the American Psychological Association. She has also served on committees or panels for organizations, including the National Institute of Child Health and Human Development, the International Reading Association, and the International Society for the Advancement of Writing Research. She has received several awards including the Career Research Award from the International Council for Exceptional Children, the Samuel A. Kirk Award from the Division of Learning Disabilities, and the Distinguished Researcher Award from the Special Education Interest Group of the American Educational Research Association.

Books

Co-author
 Harris, K. R., Graham, S., & Mason, L. (in press): Educator’s guide to powerful writing. strategies: Self-regulated strategy instruction. Baltimore, MD: Brookes Publishing.
 Graham, S., & Harris, K.R. (2005). Writing better: Teaching writing process and self-regulation to students with learning problems. Baltimore, MD: Brookes.
 Harris, K.R., & Graham, S. (1992/96). Making the writing process work: Strategies for composition and self-regulation (2nd ed.). Cambridge: Brookline Books. 1992 (2nd ed. 1996,   [pbk]) 
 Harris, K.R., & Graham, S. (1992). Helping young writers master the craft: Strategy instruction and self-regulation in the writing process. Cambridge: Brookline Books.
 Karen R. Harris, Steve Graham, Timothy C. Urdan: APA Educational Psychology Handbook: Individual differences and cultural and contextual factors (APA = American Psychological Association). Vol. 2 of the 'APA Educational Psychology Handbook'. APA-Verlag 2011, 
 Steve Graham, K.R. Harris (1997): Whole language and process writing: Does one approach fit all ? In: Issues in Educating Students With Disabilities, p. 239 - 260 

For others see 'External links'

References

External links
 Education.asu.edu
 Kc.vanderbilt.edu Vita. It names only four books

Educational psychologists
Living people
Year of birth missing (living people)